Spanish Onions is an album by pianist Les McCann recorded in 1964 at a concert at the Esquire Theater in Los Angeles, CA., and released on the Pacific Jazz label in 1966.

Reception

Allmusic gives the album 4 stars.

Track listing 
All compositions by Les McCann except as indicated
 "El Soulo" - 3:16
 "Lavande" - 6:40
 "Spanish Onions" - 8:50
 "Get Them Grits" - 4:30
"I Am in Love" (Cole Porter) - 5:30
 "Arabella" - 5:43
 "Maxie's Farewell" - 5:15

Personnel 
Les McCann - piano
Victor Gaskin - bass
Paul Humphrey - drums

References 

Les McCann live albums
1966 live albums
Pacific Jazz Records live albums